Abaarso is a small town in the northwestern Maroodi Jeex region of Somaliland. It is located 15 km west of Somaliland's capital Hargeisa, and is known for being the home to the Abaarso School of Science and Technology.

See also
Administrative divisions of Somaliland
Regions of Somaliland
Districts of Somaliland

References

Populated places in Maroodi Jeex